Helicostyla is a genus of small, air-breathing land snails, terrestrial pulmonate gastropod mollusks in the subfamily Helicostylinae  of the family Camaenidae. Helicostyla is the type genus of the subfamily Helicostylinae.

Distribution
This genus is endemic to the Philippines.

Species
Species within the genus Helicostyla include:

 Helicostyla albina (Grateloup, 1840)
 Helicostyla amagaensis de Chavez, Kendrich, Fontanilla, Batomalaque & Chiba, 2015
 Helicostyla amaliae (Möllendorff, 1890)
 Helicostyla aplomorpha (Jonas, 1843)
 Helicostyla bicolorata (I. Lea, 1840)
 Helicostyla boettgeriana (Möllendorff, 1888)
 Helicostyla bullula (Broderip, 1841)
 Helicostyla buschi (L. Pfeiffer, 1846)
 Helicostyla bustoi (Hidalgo, 1887)
 Helicostyla caesar (L. Pfeiffer, 1855)
 Helicostyla calamianica (Quadras Moellendorff, 1894) 
 Helicostyla canonizadoi (Bartsch, 1932)
 Helicostyla chocolatina (Poppe, Tagaro & Sarino, 2015)
 Helicostyla cinerosa (L. Pfeiffer, 1855)
 Helicostyla collodes (G. B. Sowerby I, 1841)
 Helicostyla cunctator (Reeve, 1849)
 Helicostyla curta (G. B. Sowerby I, 1841)
 Helicostyla daphnis (Broderip, 1841)
 Helicostyla decorata (Férussac, 1821)
 Helicostyla delicata Fulton, 1903
 Helicostyla dimera (Jonas, 1846)
 Helicostyla domingoi (Bartsch, 1919)
 Helicostyla dimera (Jonas, 1846)
 Helicostyla effusa (Pfeiffer, 1842)
 Helicostyla euconica (Bartsch, 1932)
 Helicostyla fastidiosa (Bartsch, 1932)
 Helicostyla faunus (Broderip, 1841)
 Helicostyla frater (Férussac, 1821)
 Helicostyla fulgens (G. B. Sowerby I, 1841)
 Helicostyla fulgetra (Broderip, 1841)
 Helicostyla gigas (Hidalgo, 1901)
 Helicostyla gilva (Pfeiffer, 1845)
 Helicostyla glaucophthalma (L. Pfeiffer, 1851)
 Helicostyla halichlora (Semper, 1866)
 Helicostyla hololeuca (L. Pfeiffer, 1855)
 Helicostyla huberorum Thach, 2021
 Helicostyla imperator (Pfeiffer, 1848)
 Helicostyla indusiata (L. Pfeiffer, 1871)
 Helicostyla jonasi (L. Pfeiffer, 1846)
 Helicostyla juglans (L. Pfeiffer, 1842)
 Helicostyla lacerata (Semper, 1877) (nomen nudum)
 Helicostyla leai (L. Pfeiffer, 1846)
 Helicostyla leopardus (L. Pfeiffer, 1845)
 Helicostyla leucophaea (G. B. Sowerby I, 1841)
 Helicostyla librosa (L. Pfeiffer, 1857)
 Helicostyla lignaria (L. Pfeiffer, 1842)
 Helicostyla macrostoma (L. Pfeiffer, 1843)
 Helicostyla marinduquensis (Hidalgo, 1887)
 Helicostyla mateoi (Bartsch, 1932)
 Helicostyla mearnsi Bartsch, 1905
 Helicostyla mirabilis (Férussac, 1821)
 Helicostyla montana (C. Semper, 1877)
 Helicostyla mus (Delessert, 1841)
 Helicostyla nobilis (Reeve, 1848)
 Helicostyla nux (C. Semper, 1877)
 Helicostyla okadai Kuroda, 1932
 Helicostyla orbitula (Sowerby, 1841)
 Helicostyla palavanensis (L. Pfeiffer, 1857)
 Helicostyla persimilis (Deshayes, 1850)
 Helicostyla philippinensis (L. Pfeiffer, 1846)
 Helicostyla pictor (Broderip, 1841)
 Helicostyla pithogaster (Ferussac, 1821)
 Helicostyla polita Reeve, 1848
 Helicostyla portii (L. Pfeiffer, 1861)
 Helicostyla rufogaster (Lesson, 1832)
 Helicostyla saranganica (Hidalgo, 1887)
 Helicostyla satyrus (Broderip, 1841)
 Helicostyla schadenbergi (Möllendorff, 1890)
 Helicostyla seckendorffiana (L. Pfeiffer, 1847)
 Helicostyla simonei Thach & F. Huber, 2021
 Helicostyla simplex (Jonas, 1843)
 Helicostyla smaragdina (Reeve, 1842)
 Helicostyla solida (L. Pfeiffer, 1843)
 Helicostyla solivaga (Reeve, 1849)
 Helicostyla speciosa (Jay, 1839)
 Helicostyla tephrodes (L. Pfeiffer, 1843)
 Helicostyla thomsoni (L. Pfeiffer, 1871)
 Helicostyla ticaonica (Broderip, 1841)
 Helicostyla turbo (Pfeiffer, 1845)
 Helicostyla ventricosa (Bruguière, 1792)
 Helicostyla vidali (Hidalgo, 1887)
 Helicostyla villari (Hidalgo, 1887)
 Helicostyla volubilis (Reeve, 1851)
 Helicostyla weberi (Bartsch, 1919)
 Helicostyla woodiana (I. Lea, 1840)
 Helicostyla worcesteri Bartsch, 1909

Species brought into synonymy
 Helicostyla aegle (Broderip, 1841): synonym of Cochlostyla aegle (Broderip, 1841)
 Helicostyla annulata (G.B. Sowerby I, 1841): synonym of Pachysphaera annulata (G. B. Sowerby I, 1841) (unaccepted combination)
 Helicostyla balteata (G.B. Sowerby I, 1841): synonym of Pachysphaera balteata (G. B. Sowerby I, 1841) (unaccepted combination)
 Helicostyla bembicodes (Pfeiffer, 1851): synonym of Helicobulinus bembicodes (L. Pfeiffer, 1851) (unaccepted combination)
 Helicostyla butleri (Pfeiffer, 1842): synonym of Dryocochlias butleri (L. Pfeiffer, 1842) (unaccepted combination)
 Helicostyla camelopardalis (Broderip, 1841): synonym of Hypselostyla camelopardalis (Broderip, 1841) (unaccepted combination)
 Helicostyla carinata (Lea, 1840): synonym of Hypselostyla carinata (I. Lea, 1840) (superseded combination)
 Helicostyla cincinna (G.B. Sowerby I, 1840): synonym of Hypselostyla cincinna (G. B. Sowerby I, 1841) (unaccepted combination)
 Helicostyla cincinniformis (G.B. Sowerb Iy, 1841): synonym of Hypselostyla cincinniformis (G. B. Sowerby I, 1841) (superseded combination)
 Helicostyla collodes (G.B. Sowerby I, 1841): synonym of Cochlostyla collodes (G. B. Sowerby I, 1841) (superseded combination)
 Helicostyla concinna (G.B. Sowerby I, 1841): synonym of Hypselostyla concinna (G. B. Sowerby I, 1841) (unaccepted combination)
 Helicostyla curta (G.B. Sowerby I, 1841) : synonym of Cochlostyla curta (G. B. Sowerby I, 1841) (superseded combination)
 Helicostyla dactylus (Broderip, 1841): synonym of Hypselostyla dactylus (Broderip, 1841) (superseded combination)
 Helicostyla daphnis (Broderip, 1841): synonym of Cochlostyla daphnis (Broderip, 1841) (superseded combination)
 Helicostyla decora (A. Adams & Reeve, 1850): synonym of Cochlodryas decora (A. Adams & Reeve, 1850) (superseded combination)
 Helicostyla denticulata (Jay, 1839): synonym of Calocochlea denticulata (Jay, 1839) (superseded combination)
 Helicostyla dimera (Jonas, 1846): synonym of Cochlostyla dimera (Jonas, 1846) (superseded combination)
 Helicostyla diana (Broderip, 1841): synonym of Hypselostyla diana (Broderip, 1841) (unaccepted combination)
 Helicostyla dubiosa (Pfeiffer, 1846): synonym of Cochlostyla dubiosa (L. Pfeiffer, 1846) (superseded combination
 Helicostyla euconica (Bartsch, 1932): synonym of Cochlostyla effusa (L. Pfeiffer, 1843)
 Helicostyla evanescens (Broderip, 1841): synonym of Hypselostyla evanescens (Broderip, 1841) (unaccepted combination)
 Helicostyla fenestrata (Sowerby I, 1841): synonym of Pachysphaera fenestrata (G. B. Sowerby I, 1841) (superseded combination)
 Helicostyla florida (Sowerby I, 1841): synonym of Cochlodryas florida (G. B. Sowerby I, 1841) (superseded combination)
 Helicostyla fulgens (Broderip, 1841): synonym of Cochlostyla fulgens (G. B. Sowerby I, 1841) (superseded combination)
 Helicostyla fulgetra (Broderip, 1841): synonym of Cochlostyla fulgetra (Broderip, 1841)
 Helicostyla grandis (Pfeiffer, 1845): synonym of Helicobulinus grandis (L. Pfeiffer, 1845) (unaccepted combination)
 Helicostyla hydrophana G.B. Sowerby I, 1841: synonym of Dryocochlias metaformis (Férussac, 1821) (junior synonym)
 Helicostyla ignobilis Sowerby I, 1841: synonym of Cochlodryas ignobilis (G. B. Sowerby I, 1841) (superseded combination)
 Helicostyla iloconensis (Sowerby I, 1841): synonym of Pachysphaera iloconensis (G. B. Sowerby I, 1841) (misspelling of original genus name, Orustia, Mörch, 1852)
 Helicostyla jonasi (Pfeiffer, 1845): synonym of Cochlostyla jonasi (L. Pfeiffer, 1846) (superseded combination)
 Helicostyla juglans (Pfeiffer, 1842): synonym of Cochlostyla juglans (L. Pfeiffer, 1842) (superseded combination)
 Helicostyla leopardus (Pfeiffer, 1845): synonym of Cochlostyla leopardus (L. Pfeiffer, 1845) (superseded combination)
 Helicostyla leucophaea (Sowerby I, 1841): synonym of Cochlostyla leucophaea (G. B. Sowerby I, 1841) (superseded combination)
 Helicostyla lignaria (Pfeiffer, 1842): synonym of Cochlostyla lignaria (L. Pfeiffer, 1842) (suspected synonym)
 Helicostyla macrostoma (Pfeiffer, 1843): synonym of Cochlostyla macrostoma (L. Pfeiffer, 1843) (superseded combination)
 Helicostyla marinduquensis (Hidalgo, 1887): synonym of Cochlostyla marinduquensis Hidalgo, 1887 (superseded combination)
 Helicostyla metaformis (Ferussac, 1821): synonym of Dryocochlias metaformis (Férussac, 1821) (misspelling of original name, Corasia, Albers, 1850)
 Helicostyla mindoroensis  W. J. Broderip, 1892 : synonym of Chrysallis mindoroensis (Broderip, 1841) (unaccepted generic combination)
 Helicostyla mirabilis (Ferussac, 1821): synonym of Cochlostyla mirabilis (Férussac, 1821) (superseded combination)
 Helicostyla montana Semper, 1891: synonym of Cochlostyla montana C. Semper, 1877 (superseded combination)
 Helicostyla monticula (G.B. Sowerby I, 1841): synonym of Orustia monticula (G. B. Sowerby I, 1841) (misspelling of original genus name, Orustia, Mörch, 1852)
 Helicostyla nimbosa (Broderip, 1841): synonym of Hypselostyla nimbosa (Broderip, 1841) (unaccepted combination)
 Helicostyla olanivanensis (Bartsch, 1913): synonym of Cochlostyla olanivanensis Bartsch, 1913
 Helicostyla opalina (G.B. Sowerby I, 1841): synonym of Phengus opalinus (G. B. Sowerby I, 1841)
 Helicostyla phaeostyla (Pfeiffer, 1856): synonym of Cochlostyla phaeostyla (L. Pfeiffer, 1857)
 Helicostyla pictor (Broderip, 1841): synonym of Cochlostyla pictor (Broderip, 1841) (superseded combination)
 Helicostyla polillensis (Pfeiffer, 1861): synonym of Cochlostyla polillensis (L. Pfeiffer, 1861) accepted as Calocochlea polillensis (L. Pfeiffer, 1861)
 Helicostyla pudibunda Semper, 1891: synonym of Pfeifferia pudibunda (C. Semper, 1877) (unaccepted combination)
 Helicostyla rehbeini (L. Pfeiffer, 1852): synonym of Dryocochlias rehbeini (L. Pfeiffer, 1852) (unaccepted combination)
 Helicostyla rufogaster (Lesson, 1831): synonym of Cochlostyla rufogaster (Lesson, 1832) (superseded combination)
 Helicostyla rustica (Mousson, 1849): synonym of Dryocochlias metaformis rustica (Mousson, 1849)
 Helicostyla sarcinosa (Ferussac, 1821): synonym of Helicobulinus sarcinosa (Férussac, 1821)
 Helicostyla satyra (Broderip, 1841): synonym of Cochlostyla satyrus (Broderip, 1841) (superseded combination)
 Helicostyla simplex (Jonas, 1843): synonym of Cochlostyla simplex (Jonas, 1843) (superseded combination)
 Helicostyla solivaga (Reeve, 1849): synonym of Cochlostyla solivaga (Reeve, 1849) (superseded combination)
 Helicostyla sphaerica (Sowerby I, 1841): synonym of Pachysphaera sphaerica (G. B. Sowerby I, 1841)
 Helicostyla submirabilis Möllendorff, 1897: synonym of Cochlostyla submirabilis Möllendorff, 1897 (unaccepted combination)
 * Helicostyla turbinoides (Broderip, 1841): synonym of Helicobulinus turbinoides (Broderip, 1841) (superseded combination)
 Helicostyla velata (Broderip, 1841): synonym of Hypselostyla velata (W.J. Broderip, 1841) 
 Helicostyla ventricosa (Bruguière, 1792): synonym of Cochlostyla ventricosa (Bruguière, 1792) (superseded combination)
 Helicostyla viridostriata (Lea, 1840): synonym of Cochlodryas viridostriata (I. Lea, 1840) (superseded combination)
 Helicostyla woodiana (Lea, 1840): synonym of Cochlostyla woodiana (I. Lea, 1840) (superseded combination)

References

 Bank, R. A. (2017). Classification of the Recent terrestrial Gastropoda of the World. Last update: July 16th, 2017

External links 
 Férussac, A.E.J.P.F. d'Audebard de. (1821-1822). Tableaux systématiques des animaux mollusques classés en familles naturelles, dans lesquels on a établi la concordance de tous les systèmes; suivis d'un Prodrome général pour tous les mollusques ou fluviatiles, vivantes ou fossiles. Paris, 1821 et 1822.
 Pilsbry, H. A. (1896). On the names of certain subgenera of Helicostyla. The Nautilus. 9(9): 108.
 Albers, J. C. (1850). Die Heliceen nach natürlicher Verwandtschaft systematisch geordnet. Berlin: Enslin. 262 pp
 Kennard, A. S. (1942). The Histoire and Prodrome of Férussac. Part III. The divisional names. Proceedings of the Malacological Society of London. 25 (3): 111-118. London 
 Pilsbry, H. A. (1903). The use of the generic name Helicostyla. The Nautilus. 17(5): 58
 Albers, J. C.; Martens, E. von. (1860). Die Heliceen nach natürlicher Verwandtschaft systematisch geordnet von Joh. Christ. Albers. Ed. 2. Pp. i-xviii, 1-359. Leipzig: Engelman

 
Camaenidae
Taxonomy articles created by Polbot
Gastropod genera